Jaroslav Kristek (born March 16, 1980) is a Czech professional ice hockey right winger currently playing for HC Brumov-Bylnice in the Czech fourth division. He was drafted in the second round, 50th overall, by the Buffalo Sabres in the 1998 NHL Entry Draft and played 6 games for them during the 2002–03 season. The rest of his career has been spent in various European leagues, mainly the Czech Extraliga. He won a Slovnaft Extraliga championship with HC Košice in 2010–11.

Kristek played two seasons in the Western Hockey League with the Tri-City Americans before joining the Sabres' American Hockey League affiliate, the Rochester Americans, for the 2000–01 season.  In three seasons with Rochester, Kristek appeared in 125 games and scored 23 goals. He also appeared in six NHL games with Buffalo during the 2002–03 season, recording no points.

Kristek returned to his native Czech Republic in 2003, initially signing with HC Sparta Praha on May 7 but transferring to HC České Budějovice a few months later without playing any games for Sparta. He later moved on to play in Slovakia.

Career statistics

Regular season and playoffs

International

References

External links

1980 births
Living people
Brest Albatros Hockey players
Buffalo Sabres draft picks
Buffalo Sabres players
Czech ice hockey right wingers
ETC Crimmitschau players
GKS Tychy (ice hockey) players
HC Dinamo Minsk players
HC Karlovy Vary players
HC Košice players
HC Lev Poprad players
PSG Berani Zlín players
HK Neman Grodno players
LHK Jestřábi Prostějov players
Motor České Budějovice players
MsHK Žilina players
Sportspeople from Zlín
Rochester Americans players
Tri-City Americans players
Czech expatriate ice hockey players in the United States
Czech expatriate ice hockey players in Slovakia
Czech expatriate ice hockey players in Germany
Czech expatriate sportspeople in Belarus
Czech expatriate sportspeople in France
Czech expatriate sportspeople in Poland
Expatriate ice hockey players in Poland
Expatriate ice hockey players in France
Expatriate ice hockey players in Belarus